WIOG (102.5 FM) is a radio station airing a Top 40 (CHR) format, licensed to Bay City, Michigan and serving the Greater Tri-Cities areas.

History
WIOG started operation on channel 106.3  MHz licensed by Saginaw.  Later in the 1970s the calls became WIOG (the calls resembled the number "106," as in its dial position) and the format shifted to AOR.  In 1980, with the addition of some disco records to its AOR playlist, WIOG moved to a Top 40 format, eventually taking on the name "Hits 106" and becoming one of the most popular radio stations in the market. The 102.5 frequency was originally home to WNEM-FM (later WGER), which was one of the pioneers of FM Stereo broadcasting in Michigan. With its big signal, WGER was one of the most successful easy-listening stations in Michigan; as late as 1985, when it was using TM Programming's beautiful-music package, the station was posting #1 ratings among adult listeners in the Saginaw and Flint markets, according to TM promotional literature of the time.

After the owner of WIOG bought WGER then sold the old station at 106.3, WIOG and WGER switched call signs in September 1986. WGER moved its beautiful music to the lower powered 106.3 and WIOG's CHR format was planted at 102.5.  The move paid off, as WIOG quickly became a powerhouse in mid-Michigan broadcasting. In the fall of 1986, during an economic rescission, the radio station ran a new promotion "Free Money". A chance to win $1,000 to $10,000 every hour. This helped the station meet an Arbitron rating of 30.3%.

WIOG got strong competition in the early 1990s from 100.5 WTCF "The Fox", which soon surpassed them as the dominant CHR station. Due to the competition and to a desire to appeal to more adult listeners, WIOG shifted to being a Hot Adult Contemporary station in May 1992. WTCF's departure from the CHR format in 1999, however, left the door open for WIOG to move back to CHR, which it did that July. Today WIOG remains one of the most popular stations in the Tri-Cities market, though its showing in the Flint market is more modest due to competition from CHR WWCK-FM, rhythmic WRCL and active rocker WWBN.

Notable DJs at WIOG at the time include Dean Myers, Scott "Shannon" Seipel (not to be confused with Scott Shannon), Renee Andrews, Bob Hughes, Jim Alexander, Rick Donahue, Keith Michaels, Steve Kelly and Tim Murphy. Rick Belcher was the Program Director at the time of WIOG's rating's domination.

References

Michiguide.com - WIOG History

"Superpower" Grandfathered FM's

External links
WIOG official website 

IOG
Contemporary hit radio stations in the United States
Cumulus Media radio stations
Radio stations established in 1969
1969 establishments in Michigan